Felix Latzke (born 1 February 1942, in Vienna) is an Austrian football (soccer) former player and manager.

Most notably he was co-manager of the Austria national football team in the 1982 FIFA World Cup, with Georg Schmidt, and was thus infamously credited for the Shame of Gijón, a somewhat dubious 0-1 loss to West Germany.

External links

1942 births
Living people
Footballers from Vienna
Austrian footballers
Austrian football managers
1982 FIFA World Cup managers
Austria national football team managers
LASK managers
SK Vorwärts Steyr managers
FC Linz managers
FC Admira Wacker Mödling managers
SV Waldhof Mannheim managers
Wiener Sport-Club managers
First Vienna FC managers
FC Wacker Innsbruck managers
Expatriate football managers in West Germany
Austrian expatriate football managers
FC Swarovski Tirol managers
Association football forwards
Austrian expatriate sportspeople in West Germany